Saturday night special is a colloquial term in the United States and Canada for inexpensive, compact, small-caliber handguns made of poor quality metal. Sometimes known as junk guns, some states define these guns by means of composition or material strength. In the late 19th century and early 20th century, they were commonly referred to as suicide specials.

Definition

The term "Saturday night special" refers to cheap guns used in poor neighborhoods. They are usually small, of small caliber, and often unreliable or inaccurate. A single definition is not easy to come by; while legislation in the United States has tried to define them as either "unsafe" or "of no legitimate purpose", these attempts to define are problematic.

The earliest known use of the term "Saturday night special" in print is in the September 29, 1917, issue of The Coffeyville Daily Journal, referring to a "cheap revolver". In its August 17, 1968, issue, The New York Times printed a front-page article titled "Handgun Imports Held Up by U.S.", author Fred Graham wrote, "... cheap, small-caliber 'Saturday night specials' that are a favorite of holdup men..."

The term "Saturday night special" came into wider use with the passing of the Gun Control Act of 1968 because the act banned the importation and manufacture of many inexpensive firearms, including a large number of revolvers made by Röhm Gesellschaft. With importation banned, Röhm opened a factory in Miami, Florida, and a number of companies in the United States began production of inexpensive handguns, including Raven Arms, Jennings Firearms, Phoenix Arms, Lorcin Engineering Company, Davis Industries, and Sundance Industries, which collectively came to be known as the "Ring of Fire companies".

Gun ownership advocates describe the term as racist in origin arguing that many of the guns banned were typically purchased and owned by low-income black people. In his book Restricting Handguns: The Liberal Skeptics Speak Out, gun rights advocate Don Kates found racial overtones in the focus on the Saturday night special.

Issues

Criminal use statistics

While Saturday night specials are commonly perceived as inexpensive, and therefore disposable after committing a crime, criminal behavior does not always conform to this expectation. A 1985 study of 1,800 incarcerated felons showed that criminals at the time preferred revolvers and other non-semi-automatic firearms over semi-automatic firearms. A change in preferences towards semi-automatic pistols occurred in the early 1990s, coinciding with the arrival of crack cocaine and rise of violent youth gangs.

Nonetheless, three of the top ten types of guns involved in crime (as represented by police trace requests) in the US are widely considered to be Saturday night specials; as reported by the ATF in 1993, these included the Raven Arms .25 caliber, Davis P-380 .380 caliber, and Lorcin L 380 .380 caliber. However, the same study showed the most common firearm used in homicides was a large caliber revolver, and no revolvers of any kind appear on the top ten list of traced firearms.

Availability
In 2003, the NAACP filed suit against 45 gun manufacturers for creating what it called a "public nuisance" through the "negligent marketing" of handguns, which included models commonly described as Saturday night specials. The suit alleged that handgun manufacturers and distributors were guilty of marketing guns in a way that encouraged violence in black and Hispanic neighborhoods. The suit was dismissed by US District Judge Jack B. Weinstein, who ruled that members of the NAACP were not "uniquely harmed" by illegal use of firearms and therefore had no standing to sue.

Proponents of gun ownership argue the elimination of inexpensive firearms limits constitutionally protected gun rights for those of lesser means. Roy Innis, former President of Congress of Racial Equality (CORE) and a member of the National Rifle Association's governing board, said "to make inexpensive guns impossible to get is to say that you're putting a money test on getting a gun. It's racism in its worst form." CORE filed as an amicus curiae in a 1985 suit challenging Maryland's Saturday night special/low-caliber handgun ban.

Peter Rossi and James D. Wright authored a study for the National Institute of Justice which suggested the ban on Saturday night specials was ineffective or counterproductive. A Cato Institute Policy analysis by Dave Kopel went further:
The people most likely to be deterred from acquiring a handgun by exceptionally high prices or by the nonavailability of certain kinds of handguns are not felons intent on arming themselves for criminal purposes, who are more likely to use stolen weapons, but rather poor people who have decided they need a gun to protect themselves against the felons but who find that the cheapest gun in the market costs more than they can afford to pay.

References

Gun politics in the United States
Handguns